Thakur Sahib Karansinhji II Vajirajji CSI (10 January 1846 – 8 August 1924) was the 12th ruler of the non-salute princely state of Lakhtar.

Life
Karansinhji became ruler of Lakhtar on 15 June 1846, aged five months. He attended the 1911 Delhi Durbar, and in the 1911 Delhi Durbar Honours was appointed a Companion of the Order of the Star of India (CSI). His reign was one of the longest reigns in Indian history and the fifth longest of any verifiable ruler.

References

1846 births
1924 deaths
19th-century Indian monarchs
20th-century Indian monarchs
Companions of the Order of the Star of India